is a museum located in Matsuyama, Ehime Prefecture, Japan, and inspired by the novel Saka no ue no kumo, written by Ryōtarō Shiba.

The museum was constructed by Tadao Ando. He is also known for the construction of Ryōtarō Shiba Memorial Museum.

History
In the designing process, Tadao Ando managed to represent the powerful thought of the times of people in the Meiji Era,
like Shiki Masaoka, Yoshifuru Akiyama, Saneyuki Akiyama, and more.
The museum was designed to be appreciated as a touring circuit-style garden. 
Construction work of the museum started on December 22, 2004. It was finished on November 30, 2006.
Then, on April 28, 2007, Saka no ue no kumo Museum opened.

References

External links
Saka no Ue no Kumo Museum official website 

2007 establishments in Japan
Museums established in 2007
Literary museums in Japan
Biographical museums in Japan
Tadao Ando buildings
Museums in Ehime Prefecture
Matsuyama, Ehime